Samuel Uter (born 1885, date of death unknown) was a Jamaican cricketer. He played in three first-class matches for the Jamaican cricket team in 1910/11.

See also
 List of Jamaican representative cricketers

References

External links
 

1885 births
Year of death missing
Jamaican cricketers
Jamaica cricketers
People from Portland Parish